Emuelloidae are a small superfamily of trilobites, a group of extinct marine arthropods, that lived during the late Lower Cambrian (late Botomian) of the East Gondwana supercontinent, in what are today South-Australia and Antarctica. Emuelloidea can be recognized by having a prothorax consisting of 3 or 6 segments, the most backward one of which is carrying very large trailing spines. Behind it is the so-called opistothorax. There are two families, the Emuellidae (with a prothorax of six segments) and the Megapharanaspididae (with a prothorax of three segments).

References 

 
Cambrian trilobites
Redlichiina
Cambrian Series 2 first appearances
Cambrian Series 2 extinctions
Arthropod superfamilies